The Legislative Black Caucus of Maryland, Inc. (also known as The Maryland Legislative Black Caucus) is an American political organization composed of African Americans elected to the Maryland General Assembly. Incorporated in 1970, the Caucus membership has grown from 17 to 64 and is the largest state legislative black caucus in the country.

Founding 
The Caucus was incorporated in 1970 by Lena King Lee, then a member of the Maryland House of Delegates.

Role
By drafting and sponsoring legislation to address constituent needs and by examining all bills that affect the Black populace, the Caucus acts as a legislative body on behalf of all African Americans in Maryland. Currently, of Maryland's 24 sub-divisions, only Baltimore City, Prince Georges, Baltimore, Montgomery, Howard and Wicomico Counties have elected members to the Maryland Black Caucus. So additionally the Caucus presents a Black perspective from the entire state to the Legislature and advocates public policies that promote Black social, cultural and economic progress, statewide. In addition, the Caucus serves as a research study group to generate pertinent data in support of appropriate public policies.

Current membership

Officers 2022–2024

Senators

Delegates

History

The Legislative Black Caucus of Maryland was formed in 1970 as the Maryland Legislative Black Caucus. The Caucus has increased from it original membership of 17 to its present membership of 44.  From its inception to the 1990s, only Prince George's County and Baltimore City had sent members to the Caucus.  The present membership of the Legislative Black Caucus now includes elected representatives from Baltimore, Montgomery, and Charles counties as well as the Eastern Shore of Maryland.

Former chairs

List of Chairpersons of the Legislative Black Caucus of Maryland:

2007 legislation
During the 2007 session of the Maryland General Assembly the Legislative Black Caucus of Maryland pushed several bills through both Houses and had them signed into law. One of which was a bill that required state contractors to pay their employees a "living wage." For fiscal year 2008, the living wage is set at $11.30 in Montgomery, Prince George's, Howard, Anne Arundel and Baltimore Counties and Baltimore City. It is set at $8.50 for all other areas of the State. Additionally, the Caucus pushed for SB 488. This bill allows an individual convicted of any crime, with the exception of buying or selling votes, to register to vote if not actually serving a court-ordered sentence of imprisonment, including any term of parole or probation, for a felony conviction. Another Caucus bill, SB 543-2007 Darfur Protection Act-Divestiture from the Republic of Sudan, requires the Board of Trustees of the State Retirement and Pension System to encourage companies hold actively traded accounts in its portfolio that conduct business in Sudan to act responsibly and avoid actions that promote or enable human rights violations in Sudan. Additionally, the Caucus pushed for Senate Joint resolution 6 which requires the state to express regret for the role that Maryland played in instituting and maintaining slavery and for the discrimination that was slavery's legacy.
The Legislative Black Caucus of Maryland also supported the creation of state debt for funding towards the Martin Luther King Jr. Memorial in Washington D.C., leading to a  $500,000 donation to the Dr. Martin Luther King, Jr. Memorial Foundation.

2009 legislation
During the 2009 session of the Maryland General Assembly, the following Caucus general priorities were passed:
SB 186- Correctional Facilities-Released Inmates-Identification Cards
Sponsored by Senator Catherine Pugh. This bill will require the Commissioner of Correction to issue an identification card to an inmate before being released from confinement in a State Correctional facility. The identification card must comply with the requirements for secondary identification for the purpose of an identification card issued by the Motor Vehicle Administration.

SB 489- Minority Business Enterprise Certification-Cap on Personal Net Worth
Sponsored by Senator Catherine Pugh. This bill requires that the personal net worth cap for eligibility in the State's Minority Business Enterprise program be adjusted annually according to the Consumer Price Index. Personal net worth does not include up to $500,000 of the cash value of any qualified retirement savings plan or individual retirement account. The Maryland Department of Transportation, in consultation with the Attorney General's office and specified legislative committees must evaluate whether the personal net worth cap should be further adjusted, and report its findings to the General Assembly by December 1, 2010.

SB 568-Minority Business Enterprise Program-Directory of Minority Business Enterprise
Sponsored by Senator Catherine Pugh. This bill requires the Maryland Department of Transportation to include in its directory of Minority Business Enterprises (MBEs) a list of all MBEs that are ineligible to participate in the State's MBE program because (1) one or more of its owners has a personal net worth that exceeds the statutory cap; or (2) the MBE no longer qualifies as a small business under federal guidelines.

HB 637- Task Force on Prisoner Reentry
Sponsored by Delegate Gerron Levi, this emergency bill establishes a Task Force on Prisoner Reentry. The Secretary of Public Safety and Correctional Services, or the Secretary's designee, must chair the task force and provide staff support for the taskforce from the Department. An interim report to the Governor and the General Assembly is required by December 31, 2010 and final report of findings and recommendation is required by December 31, 2011.

During the 2009 session of the Maryland General Assembly, the following Caucus budgetary priorities were passed:

 Bowie State University received the $34 million needed for their new fine and performing arts building;
 Coppin State University received $4.1 million of the $9.4 million needed for their science and technology center;
 Morgan State University received $43.5 million of the $45 million needed for campus-wide renovations, new environment studies and business schools;
 The Minority Outreach and Technical Assistance program funding remained in the budget; and
 The Office of Minority Health received $335,000 out of $1 million set aside for infant mortality programs.

Notes

Maryland General Assembly
Maryland
Civic and political organizations of the United States
 
1970 establishments in Maryland